Paskoje Sorkočević or Pasko Junijev Sorkočević (1419/50 – 1454) was a Ragusan nobleman, diplomat, judge and merchant from Dubrovnik, the Republic of Ragusa. He was a member of the Sorkočević noble family. 
 
He served in the medieval Kingdom of Bosnia as a consul in Srebrenica. He served also at the court of the Serbian Despotate under Đurađ Branković (r. 1427–56) as čelnik and diplomat. He was the most famous of the Ragusan nobility that served at the Serbian Despotate court. In 1419, Sorkočević was present at Pristina. He and Damjan Đurđević lived and traded for years in the Serbian Despotate prior to entering the service of Despot Đurađ. They acquired possessions in Serbia and became real feudal lords. In the period of 1423–30 he was chosen each year as Ragusan consul or judge. In Despot Đurađ's service, Damnjan Đurđević and Paskoje Sorkočević participated in marches against the Ottomans, and were entrusted with most important of missions in Hungary and with the Ottoman sultan. In 1445 he was present at the mining town of Novo Brdo.

In 1447 he served as a Ragusan judge. All negotiations between Despot Đurađ and John Hunyady were since 1448 were led by Paskoje Sorkočević and other that Despot Đurađ had chosen. In 1450 he is mentioned as collecting a debt in Ragusa for the despot.

Mavro Orbini claimed that Despot Đurađ liked Paskoje so much that he put up the Sorgo coat of arms at the Smederevo Fortress, still visible in Orbini's time (1614).

References

Sources

External links
 Paskoje Sorkočević - member of the Sorkočević noble family
 
 Paskoje Sorkočević - merchant from Dubrovnik in the medieval Kingdom of Bosnia

Ragusan nobility
Ragusan diplomats
Ragusan merchants
15th-century Croatian people
People from Dubrovnik
Economy of Dubrovnik
1454 deaths
People from the Republic of Ragusa
People of the Serbian Despotate
15th-century merchants
15th-century diplomats
Sorkočević family